Ashby is a former civil parish in the north of the English county of Suffolk. The parish was combined with Somerleyton and Herringfleet to form the combined parish of Somerleyton, Ashby and Herringfleet in 1987.

The estimated population of Ashby was around 50 at the 2011 United Kingdom census. There is no village centre, with the population spread across a number of scattered farms and small settlements. The area has always been sparsely populated, with the former parish population never exceeding 110. At the 1981 United Kingdom census it had a population of 42.

The county border with Norfolk is immediately north of Ashby. Fritton Decoy marks the northern border, with the Norfolk parishes of Belton with Browston and Fritton and St Olaves bordering Ashby. To the east it borders the Suffolk parish of Lound, with Herringfleet and Somerleyton to the west and south. Much of the land within the area of the former parish is owned by the Somerleyton Estate.

History
Ashby is not named in the Domesday Book. By the 13th-century it was owned by Sir John de Askby and is recorded as having 10 taxpayers in 1327. By the end of the 16th-century the parish was owned by John Wentworth. Wentworth, who also owned a number of surrounding manors, enclosed the parish common in 1599 and the site near the parish church is the location of a possible deserted medieval village.

Admiral Sir Thomas Allin purchased the manor in 1672. A series of duck decoys are known to have been operated at Fritton Decoy from around this time. These continued to operate into the 19th century, at which time the estate was owned by railway developer Samuel Morton Peto and, from 1863, Francis Crossley. The population of the parish peaked at 110 at the 1881 United Kingdom census and declined throughout the 20th-century.

During World War II an American B17 bomber crashed close to the parish church after a signal flare had exploded inside the plane. The crash, which occurred on 7 May 1944, killed five members of the crew. A memorial to these men, as well as two P47 fighter pilots killed in a collision over Fritton Decoy in April 1945, was erected on the edge the churchyard.

During the war parts of the parish around Fritton Decoy, were used for training ahead of the Normandy landings in 1944. The 79th Armoured Division used the site for the testing and development of amphibious DD tanks between 1943 and 1947. Part of the site is now used as a campsite by the Scout Association.

Church of St Mary
The Church of England parish church of St Mary is in an isolated position about  down a track, south of the hamlet. The church is built of local flint, with a small amount of red brick for quoins and repairs with stonework dating from the 13th century, although it is believed that there may have been a church on the site during the Anglo-Saxon period. The roof of the nave and chancel is thatched. It is one of around 40 round-tower churches in Suffolk.

The oldest part of the building is the Purbeck Marble Norman baptismal font, which is 12th- or 13th-century. The nave and chancel of the church are 13th-century. It was probably rebuilt early in the 16th century. The church is a Grade I listed building.

Notes

References

External links

ASH Villages, Somerleyton, Ashby and Herringfleet parish council website

Villages in Suffolk
Former civil parishes in Suffolk
Waveney District